Bhaskar Ganguly is a former Indian football goalkeeper from West Bengal. He was the captain of India national football team which participated in the 1982 Asian Games held in New Delhi. He served in Indian team in several International soccer tournaments with great success during his career in the club from 1976 to 1989 and again from 1991 to 1992, and captained the team in 1984–85. As one of the best Indian goalkeepers ever, he played under coaching of Sushil Bhattacharya. He as goalkeeper and Monoranjan Bhattacharjee as stopper back made East Bengal defence absolutely impregnable.

Honours
East Bengal
Federation Cup: 1978–79

Individual
 East Bengal "Lifetime Achievement Award": 2019

See also
List of India national football team captains

References

External links
Where have all the boys gone?: Indian Express Article

Footballers from West Bengal
Indian footballers
India international footballers
Living people
East Bengal Club players
Abahani Limited (Dhaka) players
Indian expatriate footballers
Expatriate footballers in Bangladesh
Association football goalkeepers
Year of birth missing (living people)
Footballers at the 1978 Asian Games
Footballers at the 1982 Asian Games
Asian Games competitors for India